Sir George Monoux may refer to:

George Monoux, Sheriff of London, 16th century
Sir George Monoux College, Walthamstow, London, named after the above